Richard Utete Tsimba (Salisbury, Rhodesia, 9 July 1965 – 30 April 2000) was a Zimbabwean rugby union player. He played as a centre. He was nicknamed "The Black Diamond".

Tsimba was the first black player to represent his country. He had 5 caps for Zimbabwe, scoring 3 tries, 12 points in aggregate. All his caps came at the Rugby World Cup. He played two games in the 1987 event, scoring two tries in the 21-20 loss to Romania on 23 March 1987 in Auckland. At the 1991 Rugby World Cup he was used in all three of Zimbabwe's games, scoring a try in the 52-8 loss to Japan on 14 October 1991 in Belfast.

He died in a car accident, aged only 34 years old. His wife and 3 daughters surviving him. 

On 25 October 2012, he was posthumously inducted into the IRB Hall of Fame; his living younger brother and fellow Zimbabwe international Kennedy Tsimba was inducted alongside him.

References

External links
 

1965 births
2000 deaths
Alumni of Peterhouse Boys' School
Sportspeople from Harare
World Rugby Hall of Fame inductees
Zimbabwean rugby union players
Rugby union centres
Road incident deaths in Zimbabwe